Abdulkarim Esmail Shah (25 November 1961 – 25 April 2020) was a Tanzanian CCM politician and Member of Parliament for Mafia constituency.

References

External links
 Abdulkarim Shah - MP Who Loves Playing With Water, Daily News

1961 births
2020 deaths
Chama Cha Mapinduzi MPs
Tanzanian MPs 2000–2005
Tanzanian MPs 2005–2010
Tanzanian MPs 2010–2015
Tanzanian politicians of Indian descent
Kinondoni Secondary School alumni